Pilsbryspira aureonodosa is a species of sea snail, a marine gastropod mollusk in the family Pseudomelatomidae, the turrids and allies.

Description
The length of the shell attains 10.6 mm, its diameter 4.7 mm.

Distribution
This marine species occurs off Acapulco, Pacific Mexico.

References

External links
 H. A. Pilsbry and H. N. Lowe, West Mexican and Central American Mollusks Collected by H. N. Lowe, 1929-31; Proceedings of the Academy of Natural Sciences of Philadelphia Vol. 84 (1932), pp. 33-144
 
 

aureonodosa
Gastropods described in 1932